Ultrastar is a Western Digital brand of high performance 3.5-inch hard disk drives (HDDs) and  solid-state drives (SSDs).  

The brand was originally introduced by IBM in 1994 for HDDs and was adopted and renamed to "HGST Ultrastar" by HGST after it acquired IBM's HDD business in 2003. Western Digital continued using the HGST prefix for a while after it acquired HGST in 2012 but the HGST prefix is now defunct. Some Ultrastar HDDs were sold under both HGST and WD branding (e.g. the HGST Ultrastar He10 and WD Ultrastar HC510 are the same models of HDD). 

These drives are typically used with enterprise computer systems.  The two 1994 models, the 10.8 GB Ultrastar2 and the 8.7 GB Ultrastar2 XP were offered with a variety of interfaces including Fast SCSI, Fast-Wide SCSI, SCA 80-pin connectors, and Serial Storage Architecture. Evaluations units were available in the third quarter of 1995.

Current HDD models are offered with capacities up to 20 TB and with SATA or SAS interfaces. 
Current SSD models are offered with capacities up to 15 TB and with SATA and NVMe interface.

See also 
 Deskstar
 Travelstar

References

Computer storage devices
Divested IBM products
Hitachi
IBM storage devices
Western Digital products